KBAL-FM (90.3 MHz FM) was a religious radio station licensed to Alpine, Texas. It operated on 90.3 MHz (Channel 212) with an effective radiated power of 1,000 watts and an antenna height of 71.8 meters below average terrain. It was owned by RV Ministries, Inc. It was assigned the KBAL-FM callsign on May 4, 2012.

References

External links

BAL-FM
Radio stations established in 2013
2013 establishments in Texas
Defunct radio stations in the United States
2022 disestablishments in Texas
Radio stations disestablished in 2022
Defunct religious radio stations in the United States
BAL-FM